Žrnovo is a village on the island of Korčula in Croatia. Korčula is an island on the Dalmatian coast of the Adriatic Sea and administratively belongs to the Dubrovnik–Neretva County of Croatia. It has a population of 1,308 residents. The village is situated four kilometers west of the old town of Korčula, on the D118 road.

Žrnovo is one of the oldest settlements on the island and is made up of four hamlets - Prvo Selo, Brdo, Kampus and Postrana.  The village has numerous small churches.

The well-known Croatian writer and academic Petar Šegedin (1909–1998)  was born in Žrnovo.

See also
 Kumpanija
 Korčula

References

External links 

 Where is Zrnovo on map?
Zrnovo.com

Korčula
Populated places in Dubrovnik-Neretva County